James Robert Elliott (January 1, 1910 – June 27, 2006) was a United States district judge of the United States District Court for the Middle District of Georgia.

Education and career

Born in Gainesville, Georgia, to Thomas M. Elliott, a Methodist minister, and Mamie Glenn Elliot, Elliott received a Bachelor of Philosophy degree from Emory University in 1930. He taught school to earn money for his legal education. He received a Bachelor of Laws from Emory University School of Law in 1934. He entered private practice of law in Columbus, Georgia from 1934 to 1943. He was a member of the Georgia House of Representatives from 1937 to 1943. He was in the United States Navy as a Lieutenant from 1943 to 1946, serving in the Pacific. He returned to private practice in Columbus from 1946 to 1962. He was again a member of the Georgia House of Representatives from 1947 to 1949, where he served as a floor leader for Herman Talmadge in the three governors controversy. He was also a delegate to the Democratic National Convention in 1948 and 1952.

Federal judicial service

Elliott was nominated by President John F. Kennedy on January 23, 1962, to a seat on the United States District Court for the Middle District of Georgia vacated by Judge Thomas Hoyt Davis. He was confirmed by the United States Senate on February 7, 1962, and received his commission on February 17, 1962. He served as Chief Judge from 1972 to 1980. His service was terminated on December 31, 2000, due to his retirement; he did not take senior status. He was the last federal court judge in active service to have been appointed by President Kennedy. He died on June 27, 2006, in Columbus. He is buried in Columbus.

Notable cases

In his first year on the bench, Elliott issued an order halting a civil rights demonstration led by the Reverend Martin Luther King Jr. in Albany, Georgia. He later said that the decision — subsequently overturned on appeal — was made due to a threat of violence against Rev. King and his supporters. But King biographer Taylor Branch wrote that Judge Elliott was a "strident segregationist."

In 1974, Elliott gained notoriety for overturning the conviction of Army Lt. William Calley for killing 22 people during the 1968 My Lai massacre, a decision later overruled by the appeals court.

In his later years, Elliott was rebuked by the 11th Circuit Court of Appeals for his decisions in cases where defendants failed to produce requested evidence to the Court's satisfaction.

References

1910 births
2006 deaths
Democratic Party members of the Georgia House of Representatives
Judges of the United States District Court for the Middle District of Georgia
United States district court judges appointed by John F. Kennedy
20th-century American judges
Georgia (U.S. state) lawyers
Emory University alumni
Military personnel from Georgia (U.S. state)
United States Navy officers
United States Navy personnel of World War II
Emory University School of Law alumni